3 Doors Down, an American rock band from Mississippi, has released six studio albums, four extended plays, 29 singles, one video album and one compilation album.

The band's first studio album, The Better Life, was released in 2000. Helped by the singles "Kryptonite", "Loser", "Duck and Run", and "Be Like That", the album peaked at number seven on the Billboard 200 and was certified six times platinum by the RIAA. "Kryptonite", "Loser", and "Duck and Run" all reached number one on the Mainstream Rock chart, and "Kryptonite" was certified quadruple platinum by the RIAA.

Away from the Sun, their next studio album, was released in 2002. It peaked at number eight on the Billboard 200 and was certified four times platinum by the RIAA. The single "When I'm Gone" reached number one on the Mainstream Rock chart. Another single from the album, "Here Without You", reached number one on the Adult Pop Songs chart and was certified two times platinum by the RIAA.

The band then released Seventeen Days in 2005. It reached number one on the Billboard 200 and was certified platinum by the RIAA. Their next studio album, 2008's 3 Doors Down, also reached number one on the Billboard 200. It was certified gold by the RIAA. "It's Not My Time" became the band's fifth single to top the Mainstream Rock chart and the band's second single to top the Adult Pop Songs chart.

Time of My Life, 3 Doors Down's fifth studio album, was released in 2011. It peaked at number three on the Billboard 200.

The band had sold a total of 13,337,000 albums in the United States as of July 2014.

Albums

Studio albums

Compilation albums

Video albums

Demo albums

Extended plays

Singles

Promotional singles

Music videos

Notes

References

Discographies of American artists
Rock music group discographies
Discography